Abraxas flavimacula is a species of moth belonging to the family Geometridae. It was described by Warren in 1896. It is known from Australia.

References

Abraxini
Moths of Australia
Moths described in 1896